"Real" is the debut single by English electronic music production duo Gorgon City. It features singer Yasmin on vocals. The song is the lead single from their debut album Sirens, and also the title track of their 2013 EP, Real. It peaked at No. 44 on the UK Singles Chart, No. 9 on the UK Dance Singles Chart and No. 7 on the UK Independent Singles Chart.

Track listing

Chart performance

Release history

Personnel
Gorgon City
 Foamo – production
 RackNRuin – production

Additional personnel
 Yasmin – vocals

References

2013 songs
2013 debut singles
Gorgon City songs
Yasmin (musician) songs
Songs written by Kye Gibbon
Songs written by Matt Robson-Scott
Black Butter Records singles